WAE or wae may refer to:
 Waterloo East railway station, London, England, National Rail station code WAE
 Wa (Japan), the oldest recorded name of Japan
 the word, in Hawai'ian for a hull spreader in an Outrigger_canoe
 Wadi al-Dawasir Domestic Airport, in Riyadh Province, Saudi Arabia
 Walking Across Egypt, a 1999 American film
 Walser German
 Wireless Application Environment, part of the Wireless Application Protocol suite